Lopholithodes is a genus of king crab. It includes Lopholithodes foraminatus (the brown box crab) and Lopholithodes mandtii, the Puget Sound king crab.

References

King crabs